Tumby Island is a low bedrock island located 500 m east of the southern tip of Tumby Bay (Tumby Point) in Spencer Gulf, South Australia. The island is a conservation park comprising 35 hectares. The island can be accessed on foot at low tide by traversing shallow water-covered rock flats and curving sand. Visitors should request access permission from DEWNR (Government of South Australia) before visiting and be mindful of the presence of Death adders.

History 

The island was named by explorer Matthew Flinders in 1802, after his native parish in England.

On April 20, 1909, a 15–16 ft great white shark was caught near Tumby Island by Captain Simms and the crew of the fishing cutter Minnie Simms. It was almost 10 ft in circumference. Its jaws measured 2 ft across and some of its teeth were bought by people in Tumby Bay.

On December 26, 1914, the region's first boating fatality was recorded involving a boat en route to Tumby Island departing from Tumby Bay. Mr W. A. L. Williams, chemist, was killed when his boat Dolphin capsized. All six passengers aboard survived.

In 1969, Tumby Island was proclaimed a Conservation Park and is managed under South Australia's National Parks and Wildlife Act 1972. As of 2011, no management plan exists for the park.

The island is classified by IUCN as a Category 1A conservation asset, which means that it has been 'strictly set aside to protect biodiversity and also possibly geological/geomorphological features, where human visitation, use and impacts are strictly controlled and limited.'

Features 

On the northern side of the island there is a 350 m long sandy beach fronted by 100 to 200 m wide rock and sand flats. The remainder of the island has low rock bluffs, which are steep on the southern side. Waters close to Tumby Island are known for their fishing. Popular targeted species include snapper and tommy ruff. These are best accessed from the mainland, or by boat.

The island is known to host a population of Death adders which represent a potential threat to human visitors. The island also provides roosts and breeding habitat for a variety of seabird species. The endangered fairy tern and the vulnerable eastern curlew and banded stilt have been recorded in the Tumby Island / Cape Euler coastal cell.

References 

Islands of South Australia
Spencer Gulf
Eyre Peninsula